It Grows on Trees is a 1952 fantasy comedy film directed by Arthur Lubin starring Irene Dunne in her final screen role.

Plot
The story is about a couple who discover two trees in their backyard that grow money. One morning a few days after Polly Baxter (Dunne) purchased a couple of trees and planted them in her backyard, a $5 bill floats in through an open window, spurring a curious turn of luck to her family's ongoing financial concerns.

As she continues to collect more in the following days and weeks, Polly finds that the money is actually growing on the new trees that she planted and keeps that discovery from her husband Philip (Dean Jagger). Polly finds ways to use the money, while her husband wants it to be turned in to the police.

The neighbors, the media, the bank, the I.R.S., and the U.S. Treasury all get involved. Comedy ensues as the Baxters struggle with newfound ethical dilemmas; e.g., is this money legal or counterfeit, and what happens when the money dries up like an old leaf?  All the time, however, Polly maintains that the world is full of wonder, if only people would believe.

Cast
Irene Dunne as Polly Baxter
Dean Jagger as Phil Baxter
Joan Evans as Diane Baxter
Richard Crenna as Ralph Bowen
Edith Meiser as Mrs. Pryor
Les Tremayne as Finlay Murchison
Forrest Lewis as Dr. Burrows
Frank Ferguson as John Letherby
Bob Sweeney as McGuire
Malcolm Lee Beggs as Henry Carrollman
Dee Pollock as Flip Baxter
Sandy Descher as Midge Baxter

Production
The film was based on a story by Leonard Praskin and Barney Slater. They took it to Arthur Lubin who liked it and showed the story to producer Leonard Goldstein at Universal. The studio agreed to finance and in September 1951 Irene Dunne agreed to star. They working title was There's Nothing Like Money. By November the title had changed to It Grows on Trees and the movie was going to start after Lubin finished Francis Goes to West Point.

Dunne wanted Dean Jagger as co star after seeing him in My Son John. Joan Evans was borrowed from Sam Goldwyn, who had borrowed Peggy Dow from Universal for I Want You the previous year.

The filmmakers had to negotiate with the Treasury Department who had strict rules on the creation of fake money. They agreed to money being created for the film but had several conditions which needed to be complied with, such as not showing the money in close up and sticking back together any money that had been cut up.

Lubin said his main job as a director was to "watch the tempo" and make sure the actors looked as though they "believed every word they're saying."

Lubin said that Dunne was "a doll" and "that whole picture was charming. It was made during the 1952 election and there was a lot of politics in the story about money growing on trees. I think the front office sort of ruined the comedy in it. There again, theatre owners were making decisions rather than producers."

Lubin bought the screen rights to The Wisdom of the Serpent by Adela Rogers St. Johns, hoping to film it with Dunne, but it was never made.

Reception
In 2019, Stephen Vagg wrote in Diabolique magazine, "It is effective and entertaining though very “Eisenhower era” and I kept wishing Dunne's husband was played by a movie star rather than Dean Jagger."

Radio adaptation
It Grows on Trees was presented on Radio Theater November 16, 1953. The one-hour adaptation starred Ginger Rogers and Marcia Henderson.

References

External links 
 
 
It Grows on Trees at TCMDB
Its Grows on Trees at Letterbox DVD
Review of film at Variety

1952 films
Films directed by Arthur Lubin
American black-and-white films
Universal Pictures films
1950s fantasy comedy films
American fantasy comedy films
Films scored by Frank Skinner
Films about trees
1952 comedy films
1950s English-language films
1950s American films